Admiral Charles Philip Yorke, 4th Earl of Hardwicke, PC (2 April 1799 – 17 September 1873) was a British naval commander and Conservative politician.

Background
Born at Sydney Lodge, in Hamble le Rice, Hardwicke was the eldest son of Admiral Sir Joseph Sydney Yorke, second son of Charles Yorke, Lord Chancellor, by his second wife, Agneta Johnson. He was a nephew of Philip Yorke, 3rd Earl of Hardwicke. He was educated at Harrow and at the Royal Naval College, where he was awarded the second medal.

Naval career
He later joined  (60) under the flag of Sir David Milne, on the North American station, where he was given the command of the Jane, a small vessel carrying dispatches between Halifax and Bermuda.

He attained flag rank in 1838. In 1849, while commanding , he acted as a mediator between the Mazzinian rebel and the Kingdom of Sardinia during the rebellion in Genoa following the defeat during the First War of Independence. For this actions, he was decorated by the Sardinian King Victor Emmanuel II with a Gold Medal of Military Valour, which he was authorized to accept by Queen Victoria only in 1855. In 1858, he retired from the active list with the rank of rear-admiral, becoming vice-admiral in the same year, and admiral in 1863. He retired from the Royal Navy in 1870.

Political career

Hardwicke represented Reigate in the House of Commons between 1831 and 1832 and Cambridgeshire between 1832 and 1834. In 1834, on the death of his uncle, he became the fourth Earl of Hardwicke, and inherited the substantial Wimpole estate in Cambridgeshire. He was a member of Lord Derby's cabinet in 1852 as Postmaster General and as Lord Privy Seal between 1858 and 1859. In 1852 he was sworn of the Privy Council.

Family
Hardwicke married the Honourable Susan Liddell, sixth daughter of Thomas Liddell, 1st Baron Ravensworth, in August 1833. They had five sons and three daughters, including Charles Philip, Lady Elizabeth Philippa Biddulph, Lady Agneta Harriet Montagu, and Lady Mary Catherine, whose daughter Isabel Sophie married Charles Gordon-Lennox, 7th Duke of Richmond.

Hardwicke died in September 1873, aged 74, and was succeeded in the earldom by his eldest son, Charles. The Countess of Hardwicke died in November 1886.

He also supposedly fathered an illegitimate child by one Charlotte Pratt, a serving girl at his Wimpole Hall home. Charlotte got married in 1849, and the following was noted in the marriage register:

The year before this marriage, 18-year-old servant girl Charlotte gave birth to a son, James Pratt, who was baptised on 2 April 1848. The father was understood to have been her employer, the 4th Earl of Hardwicke. "Charlotte... was a Pratt; and she was a picture. The handsomest woman that I ever remember to have seen. In harvest time to see her swinging along the road with a bundle of corn balanced on her head, both arms akimbo, was a study in colour, figure and poise". - A.C.Yorke

There is further speculation that in 1856 Hardwicke, again, fathered another illegitimate child.  This time by another servant girl, Daphne Whitby, serving at his home, Wimpole Hall.  Daphne gave birth to Charles Whitby on 7 February 1856, his baptism is registered at the Estate church, St Andrew's, on 1 June 1856. The entry in the parish register reads... 'Charles Whitby, son of (blank) and Daphne Whitby, spinster of Wimpole parish.  [Father not identified, presumably born out of wedlock.]' Daphne went on to marry Job Male, a labourer at Wimpole Hall, in April 1857.

See also

References

The Times 18 September 1873.
Charles Philip Yorke, Fourth Earl of Hardwicke, Vice-Admiral R.N. – a Memoir by Lady Biddulph of Ledbury. Source:- Charles Philip Yorke, Fourth Earl of Hardwicke, Vice-Admiral R.N. — a Memoir

External links

Attribution

External links 
 

1799 births
1873 deaths
4
Lord-Lieutenants of Cambridgeshire
Lords Privy Seal
Royston, Charles Philip Yorke, Viscount
Royal Navy admirals
People from Hamble-le-Rice
United Kingdom Postmasters General
Royston, Charles Philip Yorke, Viscount
Royston, Charles Philip Yorke, Viscount
UK MPs who inherited peerages
Charles
Fellows of the Royal Society
Members of the Privy Council of the United Kingdom
Royal Navy personnel of the Bombardment of Algiers (1816)